The 2007 FIVB Men's World Cup was held from 18 November to 2 December 2007 in Japan. The tournament was the first step in the qualification process for the 2008 Summer Olympics in Beijing, China. The top three teams qualified for the Olympics, and joined China as they had already secured a berth as the host country.

Qualification

Squads

Venues

Format
The competition system of the 2007 World Cup for Men was the single Round-Robin system. Each team played once against each of the 11 other teams. Points were accumulated throughout the whole tournament. The final standing was determined by the number of points gained.

Results

|}

All times are Japan Standard Time (UTC+09:00).

First round

Site A

|}

Site B

|}

Second round

Site A

|}

Site B

|}

Third round

Site A

|}

Site B

|}

Fourth round

Site A

|}

Site B

|}

Final standing

Awards

 Most Valuable Player
  Gilberto Godoy Filho
 Best Scorer
  Héctor Soto
 Best Spiker
  Dante Amaral
 Best Blocker
  José Luis Moltó

 Best Server
  Semen Poltavskiy
 Best Setter
  Miguel Angel Falasca
 '''Best Libero
  Sérgio Santos

External links
 Official website
 Final standing
 Awards
 Statistics

2007 Men's
Men's World Cup
Men's World Cup
V